is a Japanese manga series written and illustrated by Motoka Murakami. It was serialized in Shogakukan's seinen manga magazine Big Comic Original from March 2013 to March 2017, with its chapters collected in ten tankōbon volumes.

Story
Fuichin Tsaichen! tells the story of real-life pioneer manga artist Toshiko Ueda, the author of Fuichin-san, who dedicated her life to create manga when it was not considered a popular career choice.

Publication
Written and illustrated by Motoka Murakami, Fuichin Tsaichen! was serialized in Shogakukan's seinen manga magazine Big Comic Original from March 19, 2013, to March 20, 2017. Shogakukan collected its chapters in ten tankōbon volumes, released from September 30, 2013, to June 30, 2017.

Volume list

Reception
The series received the Excellence Award at the 43rd Japan Cartoonists Association Award in 2014. Fuichin Tsaichen! was one of the Jury Recommended Works at the 21st Japan Media Arts Festival in 2018.

References

Further reading

External links
 

Biographical comics
Seinen manga
Shogakukan manga